"Paper Doll" is a song by American hip hop group P.M. Dawn, and the third single from their debut studio album Of the Heart, of the Soul and of the Cross: The Utopian Experience (1991).

Background and composition
In an interview with Bomb, Prince Be stated,

"Paper Doll" is basically a song of unity. I used paper dolls to demonstrate how I think we should be... like the little cutouts that are holding hands all the time.

The song samples elements of "Ashley's Roachclip" by The Soul Searchers and "Angola, Louisiana" by Gil Scott-Heron and Brian Jackson. It opens with the line, "Imagine yourself as a link on a chain, the chain is wrapped around someone's mind / If you break off, then things start to change. And then you realize that there's no time." Alex Remington of The Huffington Post cited this line as an example of Prince Be's lyrics being "denser semantically than syllabically". In the song, Prince Be also says, "Imagine yourself as a cloud in the sky", and asks the audience to consider "what it would be like as a paper doll", referring to his surroundings as the "quote unquote real world".

Critical reception
Scott Poulson-Bryant wrote in The New York Times of the song, "These sentiments might seem coy if Prince Be did not report them with such wry conviction. And if the words don't move you, the groove will." Writing for the Spin Alternative Record Guide, Jonathan Bernstein stated, "Although at their most inspiring on the mellow tip, 'Paper Doll' is another loose-fitting warm weather accessory". "Paper Doll" was placed at number two on Classic Rock History's list of the "Top 10 P.M. Dawn Songs" and number four on The Boombox's list of the five best songs from Of the Heart, of the Soul and of the Cross: The Utopian Experience.

Charts

References

1992 singles
1992 songs
P.M. Dawn songs
Songs written by Attrell Cordes